The Yangga, also spelt Jangga, were an Aboriginal Australian people of the state of Queensland. They are not to be confused with the Yanga people.

Language

Norman Tindale referred to the language as Jangga.

Country
Their northern extension touched the Burdekin River, while their southern frontiers reached as far as Glenavon. The contemporary areas around Mount Coolon, Yacamunda, Mount Tindale, and Hidden Valley were all part of Yangga lands.

Social organisation
The Yangga were divided into several kin groups, the name of which one at least is known:
 Durroburra (this was a northerly clan)

Alternative names
 Durroburra
 Dorobura

Notes

Citations

Sources

Further reading

 (Possible confusion with Yanga people here.)

Aboriginal peoples of Queensland